TapTap is a mobile game-sharing community and third-party game store that originated in China, operated by XD Inc..The platform allows users to download games and engage within the community.   The platform was founded in 2016. 

In June 2022, TapTap reached an average of 9 million monthly active users from over 170 countries, including the United States, Japan, Germany, and Italy.

ByteDance, the parent company of TikTok, game developer miHoYo, and Lilith Mobile are investors of TapTap. In 2020,  MiHoYo’s Genshin Impact was published on TapTap.

Exclusives 
While with similarities to the offering on mainstream app stores such as Google Play and the App Store, TapTap holds exclusives to games such as Torchlight: Infinite and T3 Arena during alpha testing and Valorant Mobile.

Events

TapTap Presents 
TapTap Presents is a Live Show, hosted by TapTap, that first streamed on July 10th 2020, unveiling game-related updates and upcoming mobile games, including Genshin Impact and Torchlight: Infinite.

References

External links 
 

Mobile software distribution platforms